"Mean Green Mother from Outer Space" is a song from the 1986 American horror comedy musical film Little Shop of Horrors, an adaptation of the stage musical of the same name, which is itself an adaptation of a 1960 film of the same name. Written by the musical's creators, lyricist and book writer Howard Ashman and composer Alan Menken, the song is performed in the film by Audrey II (voiced by baritone singer Levi Stubbs), a sentient, carnivorous, alien plant that feeds on human blood.

Ashman and Menken wrote "Mean Green Mother from Outer Space" specifically for the 1986 film, as a new musical number not present in the stage production. The song was nominated for an Academy Award for Best Original Song at the 59th Academy Awards. It is the first Oscar-nominated song to contain profanity in the lyrics, as well as the first to be sung by a villain; Stubbs performed the song at the awards ceremony, with the explicit lyrics replaced.

Overview
Little Shop of Horrors follows Seymour (Rick Moranis), a floral shop employee who discovers, nurtures, and commercially exploits a sentient carnivorous plant that feeds on human blood, naming it "Audrey II" after his co-worker and love interest Audrey (Ellen Greene). As the film progresses, Audrey II grows larger and more demanding, and gains the ability to speak. "Mean Green Mother from Outer Space" is the 14th musical number, near the end of the film, and is sung by Audrey II. The song's lyrics reveal that Audrey II originated from outer space, and emphasize "Seymour's culpability in its creation and path of destruction".

A revival of the stage musical at London's Regent's Park Open Air Theatre in 2018 interpolated the song as an encore number sung by American drag performer Vicky Vox, who played Audrey II in the production.

Themes and interpretations
Film historian Ed Guerrero, making note of the "resonant, distinctly black voice" of Stubbs, wrote that Audrey II's rapid growth and "singing 'I'm a mean, green mother from outer space and I'm bad!' plays on white suburbanite and neoconservative anxieties that expanding non-white immigrant populations will become as large, demanding, and assertive as indigenous blacks are already perceived to be."

Author Jane Caputi, wrote that the song's lyrics "denounce those humans who have shown a poor grasp of etiquette, who remain totally oblivious to the forces that they have been 'messin' with,' and who must now face the consequences. [... Stubbs] brings markedly Black speech to the role, criticized by some as minstrel-like, although Stubbs refutes this. The Black speech tones ensure, though, that the 'mean green mother' is understood as a mutha-fucka in that sense of the indomitable and inexorable force, the "Mutha" who here encompasses Nature-Earth and Universe."

Awards and nominations

Notes

External links
"Mean Green Mother from Outer Space" on YouTube (provided by Universal Music Group)

References

1986 songs
Songs with lyrics by Howard Ashman
Songs with music by Alan Menken